This is a list of electoral results for the electoral district of Moonee Ponds in Victorian state elections.

Members for Moonee Ponds

Election results

Elections in the 1970s

Elections in the 1960s

Elections in the 1950s

Elections in the 1940s

References

Victoria (Australia) state electoral results by district